Zhang Qi (14 November 1922 – 13 November 2019) was a Chinese physician, professor and doctoral advisor at Heilongjiang University of Chinese Medicine. He was named a "Master of National Medicine" of China in 2009 and won the Bethune Medal.

Biography 
Zhang Qi was born on 14 November 1922 in Laoting County, Hebei, Republic of China. He studied traditional Chinese medicine with his grandfather, and began practicing medicine at age 20, starting a medical career spanning more than 76 years.

Zhang served as researcher and vice president of Heilongjiang Provincial Chinese Medicine Institute and as professor and doctoral advisor at Heilongjiang University of Chinese Medicine, with a specialization in the treatment and research of kidney diseases. His research won more than ten provincial and ministerial awards. He advised 40 doctoral students, 13 master's students, and three post-doctoral researchers. He also published eight books. His daughter, Zhang Peiqing, studied under him and is a physician at Heilongjiang Provincial Chinese Medicine Institute.

In September 2019, he was among the 80 recipients of the National Outstanding Contribution in Chinese Medicine Award. He served as a delegate to the 5th and 6th National People's Congresses.

Zhang died on 13 November 2019, a day before his 97th birthday.

References 

1922 births
2019 deaths
20th-century Chinese physicians
21st-century Chinese physicians
Traditional Chinese medicine practitioners
Physicians from Hebei
People from Laoting County
Delegates to the 5th National People's Congress
Delegates to the 6th National People's Congress